Sillon de Bretagne is a skyscraper in Saint-Herblain, a suburb of Nantes, in the Loire-Atlantique department of France. At 32-storeys,  it was the tallest building in France when completed in 1969. With the structure's massive  width, and a footprint of 36,200 meters square, it remains one of the largest buildings in Europe by volume, providing living and office accommodations for approximately 3,600 people.

References

External links

Buildings and structures in Loire-Atlantique
Office buildings completed in 1969
Residential buildings completed in 1969